Shamiya is an area of Kuwait City; it is located in Capital Governorate in Kuwait. It comprises 10 blocks.

References

Al Asimah Governorate (Kuwait)
Populated places in Kuwait